Nature Environment and Pollution Technology is an open access, peer-reviewed scientific journal of environmental science. It is published quarterly by Technoscience Publications and was established in 2002. The journal is indexed in Scopus, ProQuest, Chemical Abstracts (CAS), EBSCO,

References

External links 
Official Website

English-language journals
Open access journals 

Publications established in 2002

Environmental science journals
Quarterly journals